Tougher Than Love is the debut album by Jamaican-American singer-songwriter Diana King. The album peaked at No. 179 on the US Billboard 200, No. 85 on the Top R&B/Hip-Hop Albums chart and No. 3 on the Top Reggae Albums chart. It features the four hit singles, "Shy Guy", "Love Triangle", "Ain't Nobody" (a cover of the Rufus & Chaka Khan song from 1983), and "Treat Her Like a Lady".

Critical reception

A reviewer from British magazine Music Week wrote, "A fitting title adorns this strongly reggae/dancehall-influenced album which amply showcases King as an unusual female talent, who is most impressive when she sings it straight and soulful."

Track listing

Source:

Charts

Certifications

References

Diana King albums
1995 albums
Work Records albums